This is a list of notable people who were born in, residents of, or otherwise closely associated with Memphis, Tennessee.

This list is in alphabetical order by last name.

A
 Johnny Ace (1929–1954) — rhythm and blues singer
 Heather Armstrong (born 1975) — author and blogger, Dooce.com
 Kristin Armstrong (born 1973) — professional road bicycle racer and three-time Olympic gold medalist
 George Awsumb (1880–1959) — Norwegian-American architect
 Gwen Robinson Awsumb (1915–2003) — first woman elected to Memphis City Council
 Estelle Axton (1918–2004) — co-founder of Stax Records

B 

 Julien Baker (born 1995) — singer, songwriter, and guitarist
 Michael A. Baker (born 1953) — astronaut
 Adrian Banks (born 1986) — American-Israeli basketball player
 The Bar-Kays (formed in 1966) — musicians
 Lloyd Barbee (1925–2002) — Wisconsin legislator and civil rights activist
 Marion Barry (1936–2014) — mayor of Washington, D.C.
 Charles Bartliff (1886–1962) — soccer player
 Daren Bates (born 1990) — NFL player
 Kathy Bates (born 1948) — Academy Award-winning actress
 Kenneth Lawrence Beaudoin (1913–1995) — poet
 Michael Beck (born 1949) — actor, best known for The Warriors and Xanadu
 Reginald Becton (born 1991) — basketball player who currently plays for Yokohama B-Corsairs of the B. League
 William Bedford (born 1963) — basketball player
 Diane Meredith Belcher (born 1960) — concert organist, teacher, and church musician
 Chris Bell (1951–1978) — musician
 William Bell (born 1939) — singer
 Charles T. Bernard (1927–2015) — businessman and Arkansas politician, died in Memphis in 2015
 Big Star (formed in 1971) — rock band
 Blac Youngsta (born 1990) — rapper; born Samuel Marquez Benson
 Greg Bird — Major League Baseball first baseman
 Big30 — rapper
 Tarik Black (born 1991) — basketball player
 James Blackwood (1919–2002) — gospel singer, founding member of quartet The Blackwood Brothers
 BlocBoy JB — rapper
 Bobby "Blue" Bland (1930–2013) — musician
 Elizabeth Bolden (1890–2006) — oldest person in the world during most of 2006
 Charles Boyce (born 1949) — syndicated cartoonist
 Cory Branan (born 1974) — singer/songwriter
 Craig Brewer (born 1971) — film director
 Ben Browder (born 1962) — actor, best known for Farscape and Stargate SG-1
 Dave Brown (born 1946) — TV meteorologist, professional wrestling announcer
 Joe Brown (born 1947) — politician
 Isaac Bruce (born 1972) — former NFL player
 Antonio Burks (born 1980) — former basketball player
 Dorsey Burnette (1932–1979) — rockabilly pioneer, singer-songwriter
 Johnny Burnette (1934–1964) — rockabilly pioneer, singer-songwriter
 Leonard Burton (born 1964) — NFL player
 Mike Butler (1946–2018) — basketball player
 Derrick Byars (born 1984) — basketball player
 Latasha Byears (born 1973) — basketball player

C

 Herman Cain (1945–2020) — businessman, talk show host, and candidate for the 2012 Republican presidential nomination
 Tyrone Calico (born 1980) — NFL player for the Tennessee Titans
 Dixie Carter (1939–2010) — actress known for Designing Women and Desperate Housewives
 Lorenzo Carter (born 1995) — linebacker for the Atlanta Falcons
 Bob Caruthers (1864–1911) — Major League Baseball player
 Kellye Cash (born 1965) — Miss America 1987
 Rosanne Cash (born 1955) — singer-songwriter
 Cy Casper (1912–1968) — NFL player for the Green Bay Packers, St. Louis Gunners, and Pittsburgh Pirates
 Dave Catching (born 1961) — musician
 Alex Chilton (1950–2010) — musician
 NLE Choppa — rapper
 Mary Church Terrell – civil and women's rights activist
 Robert Reed Church, Sr. (1839–1912) — entrepreneur and philanthropist
 Ian Clark (born 1991) — basketball player
 Philip Claypool — musician
 Jack Clement — singer, songwriter, and record and film producer
 Lashundra Trenyce Cobbin (born 1980) — American Idol contestant
 Steve Cohen (born 1949) — politician
 Richard Colbert — rapper known as iLoveMemphis or iHeartMemphis
 Olivia Cole (1942–2018) — actress
 George Coleman (born 1935) — musician
 Barron Collier (1873–1939) — businessman
 Jazzie Collins (1958–2013) — African American trans woman activist and community organizer
 John Cooper (born 1975) — musician, Skillet
 Zack Cozart — baseball shortstop and third baseman for the San Francisco Giants
 Hank Crawford (1934–2009) — musician
 Steve Cropper (born 1941) — musician, Booker T. and the M.G.'s and The Blues Brothers
 Edward H. Crump (1874–1954) — political boss and U.S. Representative
 Randy Culpepper (born 1989) — basketball player

D

 Chastity Daniels (born 1978) — musician
 Janette Davis (1916–2005) — singer
 Rick Dees (born 1950) — radio personality
 Nancy Denson — mayor of Athens, Georgia
 Duke Deuce — rapper
Eric Jerome Dickey (1961–2021)  — author 
 Jim Dickinson (1941–2009) — musician; producer
 Peter C. Doherty (born 1940) — Nobel laureate; scientist at St. Jude Children's Research Hospital
 Shannen Doherty (born 1971) — actress known for Beverly Hills, 90210
 Young Dolph (1985-2021) — rapper (grew up in Memphis)
 Johnny Dowd (born 1948) — musician
 Marcia Van Dresser (1877–1937) — operatic soprano, recitalist and actress
 Drumma Boy (born 1983) — hip hop music producer
 William B. Dunavant (born 1932) — businessman, CEO of Dunavant Enterprises
 Donald "Duck" Dunn (1941–2012) — musician in the Rock and Roll Hall of Fame

E 
 Johanna Edwards (born 1978) — author
 William Eggleston (born 1939) — photographer
 Egypt Central (2002–2014) — band
 Eightball & MJG (established in 1991) — musicians

F

 Ben Ferguson — nationally syndicated talk radio host
 Paul Finebaum — television and radio sports-talk host
 Finesse2tymes — rapper
 Marjorie Finlay — opera singer and television personality
 Veronica Finn — pop singer of now-disbanded group Innosense
 Ric Flair — professional wrestler (adopted at six weeks; raised in Minnesota)
 Rey Flemings — music commissioner
 Avron Fogelman — former owner of Kansas City Royals and various Memphis-based sports teams; namesake of southeastern leg of Interstate 240
 Shelby Foote — author
 George L. Forbes — Cleveland City Council President, President of the Cleveland NAACP
 Clementine Ford — actress
 Harold Ford, Jr. — politician
 Jacob Ford — NFL player, Tennessee Titans
 Abe Fortas — politician and U.S. Supreme Court justice
 Cary Fowler — agriculturalist, established the Svalbard Global Seed Vault
 Morgan Jon Fox — film director
 Aretha Franklin (1942–2018) — singer in the Rock and Roll Hall of Fame
 Frayser Boy — Academy Award-winning rapper
 Nelson Frazier, Jr. — wrestler
 Morgan Freeman — Academy Award-winning actor
 Judy Freudberg — writer
 John Fry — music producer, engineer, founder of Ardent Studios
 Charlie Feathers, rockabilly musician, died here in 1998

G

 David Galloway (writer) — novelist, international art curator, journalist and academic
 Gangsta Boo(Born: August 7,1979-January 1,2023) — rapper
 TM Garret — author, producer, filmmaker, radio personality, activist
 The Gentrys — 1960s rock band with Larry Raspberry and Larry Wall
 Cassietta George — gospel singer and composer
 David Gest — event and concert producer
 Lee Giles — academic and computer scientist
 Key Glock — rapper
 GloRilla — rapper
 Ginnifer Goodwin — actress
 Robert Gordon — filmmaker and writer
 Clare Grant  — actress
 Al Green — singer, musician in the Rock and Roll Hall of Fame
 Larkin Grimm — folk singer
 Logan Guleff — MasterChef Junior Season 2 winner
 Gyft — rapper signed to E1 Music, known for his single "They Just Don't Know"

H

 Lucy Hale — singer and actress
 Richard Halliburton — explorer and author
 George Hamilton — Golden Globe Award-winning actor
 Anne Haney — actress
 W.C. Handy — musician
 Rebecca Hanover — (B.A. English/creative writing 2001), television writer, winner of Daytime Emmy Award for her work on Guiding Light
 Anfernee "Penny" Hardaway — former NBA player, NCAA Basketball coach
 E. Hunter Harrison — CEO of Canadian Pacific Railway
 Jimmy Hart — singer, pro wrestling personality
 Lori Harvey — model
 Jon Hassell — musician
 Isaac Hayes — actor and Academy Award-winning musician
Austin Hollins (born 1991) - basketball player for Maccabi Tel Aviv of the Israeli Basketball Premier League 
 Olivia Holt — singer and actress
 John Lee Hooker — blues musician
 Benjamin L. Hooks – civil rights activist and executive director of the NAACP
 Julia Britton Hooks – musician and civil rights activist
 Howlin' Wolf — blues musician in the Rock and Roll Hall of Fame
 Lewis C. Hudson — brigadier general in the Marine Corps, Navy Cross recipient
 John Hulse — college professor
 Andy Hummel — musician
 Alberta Hunter — singer

I
 Ingram Hill — band

J

 Al Jackson, Jr. — musician
 Quinton "Rampage" Jackson — mixed martial arts fighter
 Raji Jallepalli — Indian-born chef and restaurateur
 Antonio D. James (born 1985) — filmmaker; producer
 Jimi Jamison — singer, songwriter
 Roland Janes — musician; producer
 Josh Jasper — All-American college football placekicker
 John Wayles Jefferson — mixed-race grandson of Thomas Jefferson and Sally Hemings, colonel in the Union Army, cotton broker in Memphis after the Civil War
 Michael Jeter — actor
 Ashley Jones — actress
 Booker T. Jones — musician
 Leslie Jones — actress known for Saturday Night Live and Ghostbusters
 Mary Harris "Mother" Jones — prominent labor and community organizer
 Rich Jones (born 1946) — basketball player
 Juicy J — rapper
 Rob Jungklas — musician

K
 The Kat — professional wrestler
 K. Michelle — musician
 Florence Kahn — early Ibsen actress and wife of Max Beerbohm
 Francis M. Kneeland — early African American physician who located her practice on Beale Street.
 Tay Keith — record producer
 Key Glock — rapper, cousin to Young Dolph
 George "Machine Gun" Kelly — Great Depression-era bank robber and kidnapper
 Larry Kenon — basketball player, led Memphis State to 1973 NCAA title game
 Carlton W. Kent — Sergeant Major of the Marine Corps
 Albert King — blues musician
 B.B. King — blues musician, Rock and Roll Hall of Fame
 Betty Klepper - scientist

L

 Linda Thompson — singer, lyricist
 Snooky Lanson — singer and television personality
 Chuck Lanza — NFL player
 Brian Lawler — professional wrestler
 Jerry Lawler — professional wrestler
 Arthur Lee (1945–2006) — singer-songwriter
 Fannie Lewis — Cleveland Ohio's longest serving councilwoman
 Furry Lewis — blues musician
 Jerry Lee Lewis — musician in the Rock and Roll Hall of Fame
 Eddie Lightfoot — American minstrel dancer
 Alan Lightman — novelist and physicist
 Lil Wyte — rapper
 Booker Little — musician
 Charles Lloyd — musician
 Andre Lott — football player
 Lord T & Eloise — Memphis based Aristocrunk rappers and intergalactic travelers
 Matt Lucas — singer-songwriter, drummer
 Jimmie Lunceford — musician
 Herb Lusk - NFL player and clergyman

M

 Jim Mabry — Arkansas Razorbacks football All-American
 Bill Madlock (born 1951) — Major League Baseball player
 Terry Manning — music producer, photographer
 Nick Marable — freestyle wrestler who competed for USA's national team
 The Mar-Keys — musicians
 Wink Martindale — radio and television personality
 Tim McCarver — professional baseball player and broadcaster
 Hilton McConnico — designer and artist
 Kenneth D. McKellar — long-serving U.S. Senator
 The Memphis Horns — musicians
 Memphis Minnie — blues singer
 Memphis Slim — musician
 Shaun Micheel — professional golfer
 Cary Middlecoff — professional golfer, Masters and U.S. Open champion
 Ryan Miller — professional hockey player
 Lola Mitchell — musician
 Willie Mitchell — musician and music producer
 Chips Moman — music producer
 Sputnik Monroe — professional wrestler
 Lecrae Moore — musician and music executive
 Scotty Moore — guitarist
 Allen B. Morgan, Jr. — businessman, founded Morgan Keegan
 Haley Morris-Cafiero — photographer
 Wendy Moten — singer
 Steven J. Mulroy — District Attorney General, law professor
 David W. Mullins, Jr. — former Vice Chairman of the Federal Reserve
 Charlie Musselwhite — blues musician
 Zach Myers — lead guitarist for rock band Shinedown

N

 Hal Needham (1931–2013) – stuntman, film director, actor and writer
 Elise Neal (born 1966) — actress
 Pat and Gina Neely — celebrity chefs on Food Network
 Latrivia S. Nelson (born 1980) — author
 Johnny Neumann (1950–2019) — basketball player and coach
 Phineas Newborn Jr. (1931–1989) — jazz musician
 Nights Like These — Victory Records metalcore band

O
 Michael Oher — NFL player, subject of The Blind Side
 Roy Orbison — singer

P
 Woody Paige (born 1946) — sportswriter, panelist on ESPN's Around the Horn
 Hermes Pan (1909–1990) — dancer and choreographer
 Cindy Parlow Cone (born 1978) — athlete
 Chris Parnell (born 1967) — actor, known for Saturday Night Live
 Gilbert E. Patterson (1939–2007) — bishop of Church of God in Christ
 DJ Paul — rapper
 Ann Peebles (born 1947) — singer
 Paul Penczner (1916–2010) — Hungarian-born artist
 Carl Perkins (1932–1998) — musician
 Luther Perkins (1928–1968) — musician
 Elliot Perry (born 1969) — professional basketball player
 Dewey Phillips (1926–1968) — early rock 'n' roll disc jockey
 Sam Phillips (1923–2003) — founder of Sun Records
 Marguerite Piazza (1920–2012) — opera singer
 Danny Pittman (born 1958) — athlete
 David Porter (born 1941) — musician
 Lisa Marie Presley (1968–2023) — singer-songwriter; child of singer and actor Elvis Presley
 Project Pat (born 1973) — rapper
 Tommy Prothro (1920–1995) — football coach, UCLA and Los Angeles Rams
 Missi Pyle (born 1972) — actress and singer
 Pooh Shiesty (born 1999) - rapper

Q
 Lisa Quinn (born 1967) — actress, author, designer

R

 Michael Ramirez (born 1961) — Pulitzer Prize-winning editorial cartoonist
 Jay Reatard (1980–2010) — musician
 Otis Redding — musician in the Rock and Roll Hall of Fame
 Brent Renaud (1971-2011) - journalist and writer
 Charlie Rich — Grammy Award-winning musician
 Austin Riley — MLB Player
 Loren Roberts — professional golfer
 Russell Roberts — economist
 Claire Robinson — television host, author and cook
 Kali Rocha (born 1971) — actress
 Adrian Rogers — former pastor of Bellevue Baptist Church and president of the Southern Baptist Convention
 Joe Russell — former world backgammon champion
 Lance Russell — pro wrestling announcer

S

 Saliva — musical group
 Sam and Dave (Sam Moore and David Prater) — musicians in the Rock and Roll Hall of Fame
 Sam the Sham — musician, leader of Sam the Sham and the Pharaohs
 William Sanderson — actor known for Newhart and Blade Runner
 J. Peter Sartain — Archbishop of Seattle
 Clarence Saunders — founder of the world's first self-service supermarket, Piggly Wiggly
 Big Scarr — rapper
 Jerry Schilling — associate of Elvis Presley, The Beach Boys
 Dan Schneider — actor
 Josey Scott — musician
 Will Shade — musician
 Gwen Shamblin — author and founder of the Weigh Down Workshop and Remnant Fellowship Church
 Paul Shanklin — personality on Rush Limbaugh's radio program
 Cybill Shepherd — actress known for Moonlighting and Cybill
 George Sherrill — MLB player
 Lee Shippey — journalist
 Hampton Sides — author
 McKinley Singleton — NBA player, New York Knicks
 Arthur Smith — head coach of the Atlanta Falcons
 Bingo Smith (born 1946) — basketball player
 Fred Smith — founder and chairman of FedEx
 Lane Smith — actor known for My Cousin Vinny and The Final Days
 George W. Snedecor (1881–1974) — mathematician and statistician
 Bobby Sowell — musician
 Ben Spies (born 1984) — motorcycle road racer
 Marvin Stamm — musician
 Kay Starr — singer
 Ricky Stenhouse Jr. — NASCAR driver
 Jody Stephens — musician
 Andrew Stevens — actor and producer
 Stella Stevens — Golden Globe Award-winning actress
 Jim Stewart — record producer and co-founder of Stax Records
 Frank Stokes — blues musician
 Jarnell Stokes (born 1994) — basketball player
 Lewis Ossie Swingler — editor of Memphis World, editor and publisher of Tri-State Defender
 Pooh Shiesty (born 1999) — rapper

T
 Gary Talley — musician and singer of The Box Tops

 Cliff Taylor — football player
 Raymond Taylor — catcher in Negro league baseball
 Lloyd Thaxton — television personality
 Carla Thomas — musician and daughter of Rufus Thomas
 Danny Thomas — entertainer, actor and founder of St. Jude Children's Research Hospital
 Rufus Thomas — musician
 Fred Thompson — actor and U.S. Senator (alumnus of the University of Memphis)
 Harry Thompson — football player
 Linda Thompson — songwriter and actress 
 Three 6 Mafia — Academy Award-winning rap musicians
 Justin Timberlake — Grammy Award-winning musician, actor and record producer
 London on da Track — record producer
 Don Trip — rapper
 Leigh Anne Tuohy — businesswoman and interior designer
 Ike Turner — Grammy Award-winning musician

V
 Guillaume de Van (1906–1949) — Franco–American musicologist
Andrew VanWyngarden — musician of psychedelic rock group MGMT
 Alexey Vermeulen (born 1994) — cyclist

W

 Sam Walton — football player
 Teddy Walton — composer, producer, writer and DJ
 Garrett Wang — actor
 Anita Ward — singer and schoolteacher; 1979 number one Billboard Hot 100 single "Ring My Bell"
 Thomas Waterson — police officer who captured Machine Gun Kelly in a Memphis raid in 1933
 Luke J. Weathers (December 16, 1920 – October 15, 2011), former U.S. Army Air Force officer and prolific Tuskegee Airmen
 Ida B. Wells — civil rights advocate and women's rights advocate
 Junior Wells — musician
 David West — baseball player
 Red West — actor
 Kirk Whalum — musician
 Maurice White — musician, lead singer of Earth, Wind & Fire
 Reggie White — NFL player; began his career with the Memphis Showboats of the USFL
 Bobby Whitlock — musician, keyboardist in Derek and the Dominos
 Snootie Wild — rapper
 John Shelton Wilder — politician
 Elliot Williams — NBA player
 LaNell Williams — American physicist and virologist
 Louis Williams — NBA player
 Tennessee Williams — playwright
 Kemmons Wilson — businessman, founder of Holiday Inn
 Mike Wilson — NBA player
 Jesse Winchester — singer/songwriter
 Francis Winkler — NFL player
 Ernest Withers — photojournalist
 Lorenzen Wright — NBA player

Y
 Roy Yeager — musician
 Yo Gotti (born 1981) — rapper; born Mario Mims
 Thaddeus Young — NBA player (grew up in Memphis)
 Moneybagg Yo (born 1991) — rapper

References 

Memphis
Memphis, Tennessee